Marius Adrian Soare (born 30 July 1987 in Constanța, Constanța County) is a Romanian professional football player. Soare is a central offensive midfielder who currently plays for FC Farul Constanța, which last season played in the Liga I, but has since been relegated to the Liga II.

External links

1987 births
Living people
Romanian footballers
FCV Farul Constanța players
Association football midfielders
FC Delta Dobrogea Tulcea players
Sportspeople from Constanța